Vladimir Ivanovich Yerofeyev (9 October 1920 – 18 July 2011) was a Soviet diplomat, personal French language translator for Joseph Stalin (beginning in 1945) and the father of writer Viktor Yerofeyev.

References

1920 births
2011 deaths
Diplomats from Saint Petersburg
Ambassadors of the Soviet Union to Senegal
Ambassadors of the Soviet Union to the Gambia
Recipients of the Order of the Red Banner of Labour
Recipients of the Order of the Red Star

Burials at Vagankovo Cemetery